Vratil is a surname. Notable people with the surname include:

John Vratil, American politician
Kathryn Hoefer Vratil (born 1949), American judge